West Stow Heath is a  biological Site of Special Scientific Interest west of West Stow in Suffolk. It is part of the Breckland Special Protection Area under the European Union Directive on the Conservation of Wild Birds.

This site has diverse habitats with grassland, heath, wet woodland, scrub, dry woodland and former gravel workings which are now open water. The grassland has three nationally rare plants, glaucous fescue, Thymus serpyllum and spring speedwell.

There is access by footpaths, including from the adjoining West Stow Anglo-Saxon Village.

References

Sites of Special Scientific Interest in Suffolk